mRNA-capping enzyme is a protein that in humans is encoded by the RNGTT gene.

References

Further reading

External links 
 PDBe-KB provides an overview of all the structure information available in the PDB for Human mRNA-capping enzyme (RNGTT)